Peru competed at the 1964 Summer Olympics in Tokyo, Japan. 31 competitors, 30 men and 1 woman, took part in 19 events in 5 sports. 15 year-old, Rosario de Vivanco was the first female athlete to represent Peru at the Olympic Games.

Athletics

Track events

Field events

Basketball

Peru won two of its games to finish seventh in its group. It lost to Canada by one point in the knock-out stage but won its final matches against Korea to claim the 14th place.

Group B

Knockout stage

13th-16th

Squad

Carlos Vásquez	
Enrique Duarte
Jorge Vargas	
José Guzmán	
Luis Duarte	
Manuel Valerio	
Oscar Benalcázar	
Oscar Sevilla	
Raúl Duarte	
Ricardo Duarte
Simon Peredes	
Tomás Sangio

Cycling

Road

Shooting

Nine shooters represented Peru in 1964.

Pistol

Rifle

Swimming

Men

Women

References

External links
Official Olympic Reports

Nations at the 1964 Summer Olympics
1964
1964 in Peruvian sport